John Burcham Clamp (1869-1931) (known as Burcham Clamp) was an architect born on 30 November 1869 at 743 George Street, Sydneyfrom Dublin. Known as Burcham, he  won the Mort scholarship in 1882. In 1886 he received honorable mention in the student design competition of the Institute of Architects of New South Wales. In 1889 Clamp was awarded its gold medal; that May he was the first student admitted to its membership.

Early life
Clamp was born in 1869, the son of a hairdresser, John Clamp, and Sophia, née Hunt from Dublin. He was educated at the school of Christ Church St Laurence. In 1883 he became an articled clerk to the architect H. C. Kent. He attended evening classes at the University of Sydney and Sydney Technical College. In 1889, while still a student, he was admitted to membership of the Institute of Architects of New South Wales.

Career 
In 1899 Clamp went briefly into partnership with T. M. Smith, before establishing an independent practice in 1901 when he set up on his own and became known for efficient planning, competent design and secure construction. By 1910 he had been responsible for St James's Hall, Phillip Street; Victoria Hall, Manly; Lister Private Hospital and nurses' home, Darlinghurst; and such major projects as the enlargement of Winchcombe, Carson Ltd's Pyrmont wool store, and Wyoming and Castlereagh chambers in the city. His most controversial commission was to rebuild Farmer & Co. Ltd's Victoria House in Pitt Street—obliterating J. Horbury Hunt's 1874 building which had been acclaimed as 'our finest example of street architecture'. Clamp's meeting with Walter Burley Griffin in the United States of America led to a brief partnership with him in Sydney in 1914. Later he was joined by C. H. Mackellar and they designed several factories and other buildings in 1918-24.In 1914 he was briefly in partnership with Walter Burley Griffin.  Between 1918 and 1924 he worked with C. H. Mackellar.  Clamp was the building surveyor for the Anglican Diocese of Sydney, and many of his buildings were for the diocese. He also built many commercial premises in and around Sydney.

An active Anglican and prominent Freemason, Clamp was building surveyor for the diocese of Sydney, and exercised considerable influence in ecclesiastical architecture: among other projects he designed the Sydney Church of England Grammar School (Shore) Chapel, North Sydney, St Matthew's Church, Manly (with Wright and Apperly) and converted a two-storey house at Rushcutters Bay into St Luke's Hospital. He was also a founder and councilor of Cranbrook School, altering the house after its use as the residence of the State governor in 1901-15, designing new buildings and landscaping its grounds. Clamp and (C. H.) Finch were the architects between 1927 and 1930 of Tattersall's Club, Castlereagh Street, the Buckland Memorial Church of England Boys' Home, Carlingford, Canberra Grammar School and the Ainslie Hotel in Canberra. Early in 1930 Clamp's son John replaced Finch.

An active and outspoken member of the local Institute of Architects, Clamp urged the federation of the separate State bodies and in 1907 had strongly backed the admission of Florence Parsons as an associate. He had a forthright but tactful manner, self-reliance and boundless energy. He was a member of the Town Planning Association of New South Wales, the Martin Place extension committee and of Tattersall's, the Millions and the National clubs. Fortunate to practice during two boom periods in 1901-14 and 1920–28, Clamp provided a bridge between the nineteenth-century romantic and twentieth-century functionalist styles, presenting an originality of design which combined character with sound commercial possibilities.

Burcham Clamp died of acute broncho-pneumonia on 7 July 1931 at Cremorne home and was buried in the Anglican section of South Head cemetery. He is buried at the South Head Cemetery.

Personal life 
On 22 June 1893 John Burcham Clamp married Susie Young at Auburn; They later lived at Cremorne and around 1914 they moved to Greenoaks Avenue, Darling Point. They had a son and three daughters.

Partial list of works
The following buildings designed either in part or in full by Burcham Clamp:

See also

 Architecture of Australia

References

1869 births
1931 deaths
New South Wales architects
Australian ecclesiastical architects
Architects from Sydney